Sheila Watson may refer to:
Sheila Watson (priest) (born 1953), Archdeacon of Canterbury
Sheila Watson (writer) (1909–1998), Canadian novelist, critic and teacher